The Couchiching First Nation is a Saulteaux First Nation band government in the Canadian province of Ontario, who live on the Couchiching 16A and Agency 1 reserves in the Rainy River District near Fort Frances.

History
Ancestors of the Couchiching First Nation were collectively known as Gojijiwininiwag (Couchiching-men) or as Rainy Lake and River Bands of Saulteaux—"couchiching" (gojijiing) being the Ojibwe word meaning "At the Inlet", referring to Rainy Lake known in Ojibwe as Gojiji-zaaga'igan (Inlet Lake).

Originally, members of the Couchiching First Nation resided further west and others were voyageurs from the east until they moved to the Fort Frances area in the late 19th century to avoid the Louis Riel Rebellion. The Department of Indian Affairs then allocated them a tract of land north of the town but this was considered too far from the trading post by the band members. Eventually, they ended up on Little Eagle land and changed it to Couchiching.

The current band chief is Brian Perrault, Chief Perrault was re-elected to a fourth term as Chief on March 4, 2022 in the band election process. A council of six band members governs the band, and are as follows: Sandy Bruyere (re-elected), Lucille Morrisseau (re-elected), Randy Jones (re-elected), Cheyenne Vandermeer, Kourtney Perrault & Peggy Loyie. The current term of Chief & Council runs from 2022-2024.

Programs
Couchiching First Nations administers over a dozen programs within the reserve.

Wasaw Companies
Couchiching First Nation had early residences in the Wasaw area north of Frog Creek/Frog Lake and this area was highly regarded in the busy forestry and wild rice harvests in the nineteenth century.  After 1909, flooding impacts and expropriation of land for the railway and highway forced the community to move south of Frog Creek and along Sand Bay (south of Highway 11 east of Fort Frances).  The Wasaw companies include Wasaw Business Enterprises, Wasaw Project Inc., Wasaw Construction Ltd., Wasaw Developments, and Wasaw Food Services, Inc.  These companies are meant to create own source revenue for the community in order to build an economic base for the community.

Wasaw (waasa) in the Ojibwe, the language of Couchiching, means "Far".

Notable people

Susan Blight, artist
Tara Houska, advocate 
Ryan McMahon, comedian

References

External links
 Couchiching First Nation
 Couchiching First Nation profile from AANDC
 Couchiching First Nation profile from Chiefs of Ontario
 our Economic Development

First Nations governments in Ontario
Communities in Rainy River District
Saulteaux

hr:Goojijiwininiwag